Federal Route 93, or Jalan Sungai Sayong, is the main federal road in Johor, Malaysia.

Features

At most sections, the Federal Route 93 was built under the JKR R5 road standard, allowing with a limit of 90 km/h.

List of junctions and towns

References

093